Dieter Koulmann (4 December 1939 – 26 July 1979) was a German footballer. He was part of the Bayern Munich team of the mid-1960s, winning the DFB-Pokal in 1966 and 1967, and the UEFA Cup Winners' Cup in 1967. He later had spells with Kickers Offenbach and MSV Duisburg.

References

External links
 

1939 births
1979 deaths
German footballers
FC Bayern Munich footballers
Kickers Offenbach players
MSV Duisburg players
Bundesliga players
People from Schwarzwald-Baar-Kreis
Sportspeople from Freiburg (region)
People from the Republic of Baden
Association football midfielders
Footballers from Baden-Württemberg
West German footballers